David Burgess is a former association football player who represented New Zealand at the international level.

Burgess made his full All Whites debut in a 2-0 win over Ghana on 7 June 1983 and ended his international playing career with four A-international caps to his credit, his final cap a substitute appearance in a 0-2 loss to South Korea on 22 April 1984.

He has since become a journalist, with stints at newspapers including The Dominion Post in Wellington where he was the local council reporter. He also maintains a keen interest in the Wellington Phoenix football franchise, which he covered for the paper.

References

External links

Year of birth missing (living people)
Living people
New Zealand association footballers
New Zealand international footballers
Miramar Rangers AFC players
20th-century births
Association football midfielders